Laleh-Zar street is one of the oldest streets of Tehran, Iran. This street is bordered to the south by Imam Khomeini square (former Toopkhaneh), and to the north by Enqelab Street (former Shah Reza Street).

At the end of the Qajar era and beginning of the Pahlavi era it was a symbol of modernism and art of Iran and was called as "Tehran's Champs-Elysées". Many theaters, restaurants, businesses, cabarets, dish-sellers, dressmakers, cinemas, and famous shops of Iran were located in this street.

Laleh-Zar district was Once the street in which all the cinema of Tehran were placed. The first movie in the history of Iran was shown in the Laleh cinema. This cinema itself was first inaugurated in 1945 and Prior to that this region was once the place of  Mosafa garden, a Royal garden for the families and a place for the diplomats.

This street is also the birthplace of the first passage of Iran based on a western architecture.

Due to the interest of Qajars and the western layout of this street also many other advancements first started right here. For instance, The first telegram wire of Tehran was initiated in this sub region and since then many things have changed.

History 
Laleh-Zar Street, at the time it was constructed the length was eight hundred steps, which started from Topkhaneh Square and reached the Laleh-Zar square. This street was named Laleh-Zar because before it was full of wild tulips and beautiful trees, which was one of the royal resorts at that time. The eastern part of it leads to the Philikhaneh and the western part leads to Ala Al-Dawlah Street. It is said that after the return of Naser al-Din Shah from his first trip to Europe, where he had seen long streets and large squares, as he was influenced by the beauty of European street, he decided to construct a street (Laleh-Zar) through this area and tried to copy a Champs Elysees in Tehran. By his order, they cut the trees and destroyed this green area, and its lands were divided among the royal family, a significant part of which was given to Mirza Ali Asghar Khan "Atabak".

 Laleh-Zar Street has a wagon line on the surface and the Grand Hotel. A car can pass in the middle of the street. It has wooden electric poles, called Shah Sim and also, cast iron telegraph poles.

After Nassereddin Shah's first visit to the Europe (which was in 1873), he ordered that a street like the Champs-Elysées be constructed in Tehran.

Later, at the time of the Pahlavis, singers of Iranian popular music like Mahvash, Afat, Ghasem Jebeli, Tajik, Roohparvar, Ali Nazari, Aghasi, Soosan, and Iraj Habibi all sang in cabarets on this street.

Jafar Shahri, in the book "Old Tehran", notes that 

At one time, there were 15 cinemas and multiple theaters active there, however today only ten cinemas are active in this street, most of which have lost their popularity.

References 

Streets in Tehran